"Take Me in Your Arms" is a country music song written by Cindy Walker, sung by Eddy Arnold, and released on the RCA Victor label. In December 1949, it reached No. 1 on the country juke box chart. It spent 17 weeks on the charts and was the No. 7 juke box country record of 1950.

See also
 Billboard Top Country & Western Records of 1950

References

Eddy Arnold songs
1950 songs
Songs written by Zeke Clements